The Colorado Mesa Mavericks baseball program represents Colorado Mesa University in the NCAA Division II, in the Rocky Mountain Athletic Conference. The Mavericks play their home games at Suplizio Field. The Mavericks made it to the Division II College World Series for the first time in program history in 2009. In 2014, the Mavericks enjoyed their most successful postseason result to date, making it all the way to the Division II national championship, where they were eventually beaten by Southern Indiana. The Mavericks are coached by seasoned veteran Chris Hanks.

References